James McGrigor (1771–1858) was a Scottish physician, military surgeon, botanist and baronet.

James McGrigor may also refer to:
Sir Jamie McGrigor, 6th Baronet (born 1949), Scottish politician
Sir James Rhoderic Duff McGrigor, 3rd Baronet (1857–1924) of the McGrigor baronets

See also
James McGregor (disambiguation)
James MacGregor (disambiguation)